The 2011–12 Wyoming Cowboys basketball team represented the University of Wyoming during the 2011–2012 NCAA Division I men's basketball season. Their head coach was Larry Shyatt in his first year. They played their home games at the Arena-Auditorium in Laramie, Wyoming. The Cowboys are a member of the Mountain West Conference. They finished the season 21–12, 6–8 in Mountain West play to finish in sixth place. They lost in the quarterfinals of the Mountain West Basketball tournament to UNLV. They were invited to the 2012 College Basketball Invitational where they defeated North Dakota State in the first round before falling to Washington State in the quarterfinals.

Roster

Statistics

Schedule and results

|-
!colspan=9 style=| Exhibition

|-
!colspan=9 style=| Regular season

|-
!colspan=9 style=| Mountain West tournament

|-
!colspan=9 style=| CBI

References

Wyoming Cowboys basketball seasons
Wyoming
Wyoming
Wyoming Cowboys bask
Wyoming Cowboys bask